La Périgord Ladies is an elite women's professional one-day road bicycle race held in France and is currently rated by the UCI as a 1.2 race.

Past winners

References 

Cycle races in France
Women's road bicycle races